Gray's pipefish, also known as the mud pipefish or spiny pipefish (Halicampus grayi) is a species of marine fish of the family Syngnathidae. It is found in the Indo-Pacific in the Gulf of Aden, Sri Lanka, and from the Gulf of Thailand to Japan, the Marshall Islands, and the Great Barrier Reef. It occurs in muddy habitats, in estuaries, and on coral reefs, where it likely feeds on small crustaceans. This species is ovoviviparous, with males carrying eggs in a brood pouch before giving birth to live young.

Etymology
The fish's patronym was not identified but it was certainly in honor of British zoologist John Edward Gray (1800-1875), who got Kaup’s monograph on syngnathid fishes published under the auspices of the British Museum.

Discription
H. grayi is brownish with dark bars along the side of its body, and pale bars on the gill membrane. This colouring provides extremely good camouflage for muddy and silty habitats, where the species will cover itself to stay hidden.

References

Taxa named by Johann Jakob Kaup
Fish described in 1856
grayi
Marine fish